Thomas Randolph Ross (October 26, 1788 – June 28, 1869) was a United States Representative from Ohio.

Born in New Garden Township, Pennsylvania, Ross completed preparatory studies.
He studied law, was admitted to the bar, and began practice in Lebanon, Ohio, in 1810.

Ross was elected as a Republican to the Sixteenth and Seventeenth Congresses and reelected as a Crawford Republican to the Eighteenth Congress (March 4, 1819 – March 3, 1825).
He served as chairman of the Committee on Revisal and Unfinished Business (Seventeenth and Eighteenth Congresses).
He was an unsuccessful candidate for reelection in 1824 to the Nineteenth Congress.
He resumed the practice of law in Lebanon. He lost his eyesight in 1866.
He died on his farm near Lebanon, Ohio, June 28, 1869, and was interred in Lebanon Cemetery. His brother-in-law was former Ohio Governor Thomas Corwin, who married Ross' sister Sarah.

Sources

1788 births
1869 deaths
People from Chester County, Pennsylvania
People from Lebanon, Ohio
American blind people
Democratic-Republican Party members of the United States House of Representatives from Ohio
19th-century American politicians